The 2016–17 Auburn Tigers women's basketball team will represent Auburn University during the 2016–17 NCAA Division I women's basketball season. The Tigers, led by fifth year head coach Terri Williams-Flournoy, play their home games at Auburn Arena and were members of the Southeastern Conference. They finished the season 17–15, 7–9 in SEC play to finish in a tied for eighth place. They lost in the second round of the SEC women's tournament to Georgia. They received an at-large to the NCAA women's tournament where lost to NC State in the first round.

Roster

Schedule

|-
!colspan=9 style="background:#172240; color:#FE3300;"| Non-conference regular season

|-
!colspan=9 style="background:#172240; color:#FE3300;"| SEC regular season

|-
!colspan=9 style="background:#172240; color:#FE3300;"| SEC Women's Tournament

|-
!colspan=9 style="background:#172240; color:#FE3300;"| NCAA tournament

Source

Rankings
2016–17 NCAA Division I women's basketball rankings

See also
 2016–17 Auburn Tigers men's basketball team

References

Auburn Tigers women's basketball seasons
Auburn
Auburn Tigers women's basketball
Auburn Tigers women's basketball
Auburn